AAMCO is an American transmission-repair franchise founded by Robert Morgan and Anthony A. Martino (who used the first letter of each name to form the names AAMCO and later MAACO) in 1957 in Philadelphia. Martino eventually ended his affiliation with AAMCO to manage the MAACO autobody-shop franchise, but Morgan stayed on with his son, Keith Morgan, succeeding him as CEO.

In 2006, the company was acquired by American Capital. In January 2017, American Driveline Systems, the franchiser of the AAMCO and Cottman Transmission and Total Auto Care brands, was acquired by Transom Capital Group. In October of the same year, Icahn Enterprises L.P. (NASDAQ: IEP) announced it had acquired American Driveline Systems through a wholly-owned subsidiary. Aamco has consistently ranked on the Entrepreneurs Franchise 500

History

Anthony A. Martino started repairing automatic transmissions from leased space in an Esso shop in Philadelphia. In 1957, he founded the Anthony A. Martino Company, or AAMCO in Philadelphia, under the name AAMCO Auto and Truck Repair. This name was chosen not only to reflect the initials of the founder, but also to make it appear higher in the Yellow pages listings of the day. Along with partners Richard Silva and Walter D'lutz', Martino opened several other shops in the Philadelphia area. Owing to the complexity and failure rate of automatic transmissions of the day, Martino quickly decided to drop the "Auto and Truck Repair", and focus solely on transmissions, where the company would stay focused until 2007.

In 1962, Robert Morgan approached Martino with the concept of a national chain of transmission repair stores branded as AAMCO. Martino was receptive to the idea, and the shops operated in cooperation with Silva and DeLutz were rebranded as AAMCO. The first franchise was not sold until 1963, when an AAMCO shop was opened by Ivan and Jack Ginninger in Newark, New Jersey.

In 2006, American Capital purchased AAMCO and moved the headquarters from Philadelphia to nearby Horsham, Pennsylvania.

Owing in part to the increased reliability of automatic transmissions, and thus the lengthened repair cycle, in the mid-2000s, the company rebranded to AAMCO Transmissions and Total Car Care. Today, AAMCO is the world's largest franchisor of transmission specialists and car repair shops, operating over 600 franchise stores in the United States, Canada.

In popular culture

AAMCO is also known for its distinctive television and radio commercials, which end with a voice saying "AAMCO, double-A [car horn beeps twice] M-C-O."

The company has made heavy use of celebrity spokespeople in its advertising, and was one of the first to use a celebrity spokesperson in a television ad. Zsa Zsa Gabor was the company's first paid spokesperson. Other AAMCO spokespeople included Robin Williams, Johnny Unitas, Wilt Chamberlain, Louise Lasser, and Claude Akins.

The company also used James Brolin whose marriage to Barbra Streisand gained a great deal of exposure not only the actor, but AAMCO through appearances on late night shows such as Late Night with David Letterman and The Tonight Show.

An AAMCO radio commercial was the topic of an episode of Curb Your Enthusiasm where Larry David, unfamiliar with the commercials, mistook the car horn for a real driver honking at him.  The ensuing conflict and his coincidental relationship with an AAMCO franchise owner became the plot for the episode.

The instrumental piece "Jessica" has recently been used as background music during the commercial.

References

External links
Official AAMCO Website
 VMSD Article on The Re-Branding of AAMCO
 Hanson Associates Re-Brands Aamco

Franchises
American companies established in 1957
Retail companies established in 1957
Automotive repair shops of the United States
Companies based in Philadelphia
Companies based in Montgomery County, Pennsylvania
Private equity portfolio companies
1957 establishments in Pennsylvania